The Springfield Armory XD is a series of  semi-automatic pistols sold  by Springfield Armory, Inc., in the United States along with follow-on variants: XD-M, XD-S, and XD-E. Polymer-framed and predominantly striker-fired, the series is manufactured by HS Produkt in Karlovac, Croatia.

History 
In 2002, Springfield Armory, Inc., negotiated licensing rights to the United States market for the polymer-frame striker-fired HS2000 pistol being manufactured in Croatia by HS Produkt.

Using XD (eXtreme Duty) branding, Springfield Armory subsequently expanded the series to include ten models in three different calibers and five different cartridges, seven barrel lengths, and six finishes (black, black bi-tone, olive drab, olive drab bi-tone, flat dark earth, and flat dark earth bi-tone). The XD sub-compact was named "Pistol of the Year" by American Rifleman for 2003, followed by the XD chambered in .45 ACP being named "Handgun of the Year" by both American Rifleman and the Shooting Industry Academy of Excellence for 2006.

The  variant (where 'M' represents match grade) was introduced in mid-2008; it won "Handgun of the Year" from American Rifleman for 2009. The most noticeable differences from the original XD models are the interchangeable back-straps and match-grade barrel. The first XD-M was chambered in .40 S&W with a  barrel, holding 16 rounds in the magazine. This was soon followed by 9×19mm Parabellum (9mm) and .45 ACP chamberings. In 2018, 10mm Auto was added. The XD-M series is also produced as compact pistols in .40 S&W, .45 ACP and 9mm with  barrels. A "competition" series is chambered in 9mm, 10mm Auto, .40 S&W, and .45 ACP with a  barrel, remotely resembling the tactical XD pistols with  barrels.

In January 2012, Springfield Armory announced a new variant, marketed as the XD-S. The 'S' represents the single-stack magazine used, providing a slimmer grip. While sharing many features with the original XD and XD-M, the XD-S included a new pre-set trigger and a disassembly fail-safe, neither of which were available in XD or XD-M models. The fail-safe disassembly prevents the disassembly lever from being manipulated when there is a magazine in the pistol. Conversely, when the disassembly lever is up, a magazine cannot be inserted into the pistol. The .45 ACP XD-S has a 5+1 capacity (with optional 6+1 and 7+1 magazines) and a  barrel. In January 2013, an  XD-S chambered in 9×19mm Parabellum (9mm) was introduced. It is the same as the .45 ACP model, the only difference being that the 9mm XD-S has a 7+1 capacity (with optional 8+1 and 9+1 magazines) and is marginally heavier due to a smaller barrel bore.

In 2014, Springfield Armory unveiled the XD Mod.2, increasing their XD lineup to 33 offerings. The XD Mod.2 includes ergonomic improvements, the most notable of which is the "Grip Zone"; three differently textured areas on the grip, each with their own unique texturing, in contrast to the original XD design with traditional grip texturing. The pistol also has a new set of sights. Springfield Armory upgraded the front sight to a red fiber optic. The rear sight is still a two dot, though its profile has been lowered, and is still constructed of steel to facilitate its use in racking the slide.

In 2017, Springfield Armory added the XD-E, with the 'E' denoting that the variant uses an external hammer; operation is double action / single action (DA/SA). Originally offered in 9mm, a version chambered in .45 ACP was subsequently added.

In 2018, the company introduced a refresh to the XD-S, the XD-S Mod.2 variant. Included in the refresh are safeties on the grip and trigger. Also introduced in 2018 was an XD-M chambered in 10mm Auto.

Reception
Reception for the Springfield Armory XD has been largely positive. Many high-profile shooters and gun experts have spoken highly of the XD line, including Massad Ayoob and Ron Avery. Following the introduction of the XDM 5.25" model (which was designed with input by USPSA National Champion Rob Leatham) and, later, the XDM Elite series, the XD has steadily grown in popularity with the competition shooting market. The XDM Elite series, with further improvements designed for professional shooters such as a flared magwell, improved sights and increased capacity, continued the XD's rise in competitive popularity.

The XD-S in 9mm was named "Handgun of the Year" by American Rifleman for 2013. In 2021, the XDM Elite was awarded a Reader's Choice Award by Ballistic’s Best magazine.

Variants 

, the XD series has been offered in four branding variants (XD, XD-M, XD-S, XD-E), with XD and XD-S also offered in second generation (Mod.2) configurations.

Notes:
 Not all possible combinations of the above listed parameters have been offered.
 Limited-capacity magazines are available for states with a high-capacity magazine ban.
 Capacities in the below tables reflect magazine capacity "plus one", for a round in the chamber.

XD

, for the XD series, the only offerings listed on the company's website are sub-compact (in 9mm and .40 S&W) and service models (in 9mm, .40 S&W, and .45 ACP).

XD Mod.2

, for the XD Mod.2 series, the only offerings listed on the company's website are sub-compact and service models, both in 9mm and .45 ACP.

XD-M
M = Match grade

Notes:
 Standard models: the .40 S&W chambering with 3.8-inch barrel has been discontinued.
 Compact models: these have been discontinued.
 Competition models: the .40 S&W offering has been discontinued.
 OSP models: these have threaded barrels and a removable plate on the slide, allowing a red dot sight to be installed.
 Threaded barrel models: the 9mm offering has been discontinued.
 Elite models: the Tactical OSP offering has a threaded barrel and is optics-ready; the slide is a flat dark earth color.

XD-S
S = Single stack

, the original XD-S series offerings are no longer listed on the company's website.

XD-S Mod.2

XD-E
E = External hammer

Users 

 : Issued or approved for use by a large number of police departments and other law enforcement agencies, including the Chicago Police Department, Beverly Hills Police Department, Lake Ozark Police Department, Seattle Police Department and the Houston Police Department.

Notes

References

Further reading

External links 

 Springfield XD (My first experience) by Hickok45 via YouTube
 XDm 45 by Hickok45 via YouTube
 XDm 5.25 (Three Calibers) by Hickok45 via YouTube
 Springfield XDE vs XDS by MarksmanTV via YouTube

.357 SIG semi-automatic pistols
.40 S&W semi-automatic pistols
.45 ACP semi-automatic pistols
.45 GAP semi-automatic pistols
9mm Parabellum semi-automatic pistols
10mm Auto semi-automatic pistols
Police weapons
Semi-automatic pistols of the United States
Short recoil firearms
Weapons and ammunition introduced in 2002
Springfield Armory Inc. firearms